As the home of the Pope and the Catholic curia, as well as the locus of many sites and relics of veneration related to apostles, saints and Christian martyrs, Rome had long been a destination for pilgrims. The Via Francigena was an ancient pilgrim route between England and Rome. It was customary to end the pilgrimage with a visit to the tombs of Saints Peter and Paul. Periodically, some were moved to travel to Rome for the spiritual benefits accrued during a Jubilee. These indulgences sometimes required a visit to a specific church or churches. Pilgrims need not visit each church.

Origin of the itinerary
The tradition of visiting all seven churches was started by Philip Neri around 1553 in order to combine conviviality and the sharing of a common religious experience through discovering of the heritage of the early Saints. Neri drew up an itinerary that included visits to St. Peter's Basilica, then St. Paul Outside-the-Walls, St. Sebastian's, St. John Lateran, Holy Cross-in-Jerusalem, St. Lawrence-Outside-the Walls and finally St. Mary Major. He and a few friends and acquaintances would gather before dawn and set out on their walk. At each church, there would be prayer, hymn singing and a brief sermon by Neri.

A simple meal was pre-arranged at the gardens of the Villa Mattei. The Mattei family opened their grounds for pilgrims to rest in and provided them with bread, wine, cheese, eggs, apples and salami. During these "picnics", musicians would play and singers would perform. These pilgrimages were designed to be a counterpoint to the raucous behavior of Carnival.

Churches

There are seven Holy Year churches in Rome (listed according to the order of precedence): 

Basilica of St. John Lateran (Major Papal archbasilica)
St. Peter's Basilica (Major Papal basilica)
Basilica of Saint Paul Outside the Walls (Major Papal basilica)
Basilica of St. Mary Major (Major Papal basilica)
Basilica of Saint Lawrence outside the Walls (Minor Papal basilica)
Basilica of the Holy Cross in Jerusalem (Minor basilica)
Sanctuary of Our Lady of Divine Love** (Shrine)
formerly St. Sebastian Outside-the-Walls (Minor basilica), replaced on pilgrimage route by Pope John Paul II in the year 2000.

St. Peter's Basilica and the Basilica of Saint Paul Outside the Walls were designated as pilgrim churches by Pope Boniface VIII for the first Holy Year in 1300. Pope Clement VI added the Basilica of St. John Lateran in 1350 and Pope Gregory XI added Santa Maria Maggiore in 1375. These are the four major Papal Basilicas in Rome. Each contains a Holy Door, opened only during official Jubilee years. Sanctuary of Our Lady of Divine Love was added by Pope John Paul II for the Great Jubilee of 2000, replacing St. Sebastian Outside-the-Walls. However, many pilgrims still prefer the pre-2000 seven basilicas and so also attend St. Sebastian's in addition to the ones required for the indulgence, or even instead of the Santuario (given that the walk from the Santuario to the Inner City takes at least a half-day just for itself, and that there is an indulgence for visiting any of the four major basilicas anyway).Some pilgrims walk parts of it and use taxis or public transportation for the rest.

The Seven Church Walk is traditionally done on Wednesday of Holy Week.

There is also a Seven Churches tour in Turkey that visits all seven of the Christian churches mentioned in the Book of Revelation, including the church at Ephesus.

Classic Seven Pilgrim Churches of Rome

Guidebooks to Rome
Guidebooks have existed since Ancient times. A periplus was a manuscript listing ports and coastal landmarks, in order and with approximate intervening distances, that the captain of a vessel could expect to find along a shore. An itinerarium was an Ancient Roman road map in the form of a showing cities, villages (vici) and other stops, with the intervening distances. 

The first such guidebooks for Medieval Rome were compiled in the 12th century to address the needs of travelers to Rome. The Seven Pilgrim Churches of Rome are listed in the following order in the guide by Franzini (1595): San Giovanni Laterano, St Peter's, San Paolo fuori le mura, Santa Maria Maggiore, San Lorenzo fuori le mura, San Sebastiano, and Santa Croce in Gerusalemme. Giovanni Baglione in his book list nine major churches of Rome, adding somewhat peculiarly the church of Santa Maria Annunziata dei Gonfalone and the trio of churches known once as alle Tre Fontane, and located at the site of St Paul's martyrdom: Santi Vincenzo e Anastasio alle Tre Fontane, Santa Maria Scala Coeli and San Paolo alle Tre Fontane.

Guides prior to the mid-18th century are intended for those on religious pilgrimage, while those afterward include guides for those with a cultural interest in antiquity and art, while maintaining a distance from focus on devotional aspects.

While these continued to have importance, by the 18th century, the storied history as well as its treasures of Italian art, also drew cultural pilgrims on a Grand Tour of Europe that almost always included Rome. Early proponents included Richard Lassels in his 1670 book on a Voyage to Italy. These writings now serve a role in scholarship about the history of Rome, present and past. Among the pre-modern guides or itineraries to Rome, are:

Mirabilia Urbis Romae (1140s), Anonymous.
Descriptio urbis Romae  (ca.1433), Leon Battista Alberti
Roma Instaurata,  (written 1444  printed 1481), Flavio Biondo

Studio di Pittura scoltura et architettura nelle Chiese di Roma  (1674), Abate Filippo Titi.

Antiquae Notitia or the antiquities of Rome in two parts. (1713), Basil Kennett.
Indice istorico del gran prospetto di Roma: ovvero Itinerario Istruttivo. (1765) Giuseppe Vasi.
Nuova Descrizione di Roma Antica e Moderna e de suoi Contorni Volume 1  (1820), Carlo Fea.

See also
 Holy door
 Jubilee (Christianity)
 Major basilica
 Seven Churches Visitation
 Station days

References

External links
The Vatican: spirit and art of Christian Rome, a book from The Metropolitan Museum of Art Libraries (fully available online as PDF), which contains material on these churches

 
Christian buildings and structures in the Roman Empire
Pilgrimage accounts